The Shackled City Adventure Path (or simply Shackled City) is a role-playing game Adventure Path designed for Dungeons & Dragons (D&D), originally appearing as a series of modules in Dungeon magazine, and later collected in a hardcover edition collecting all previous installments plus an additional chapter written especially for the book release. Various elements of the game were revised for the collection; the setting was enlarged to better suit the needs of a typical high-level game.

Campaign information

Location 
Shackled City is primarily set in the city of Cauldron. Cauldron itself is nominally located in the World of Greyhawk, although the series is designed to be easily adapted to other D&D campaign settings.

=== Shackled City'''s impact on Cauldron ===

The Adventure Paths were widely lauded throughout the gaming industry, and the collected issues of Shackled City, including extensive background and location notes on Cauldron and its residents, were nominated for and received multiple ENnies in 2006.

 Purpose 
The adventures are designed to begin with first level characters and to end with characters at or near twentieth level, taking them through twelve distinct adventures that span basic dungeon crawls, urban adventures, political intrigue, and even extra-planar excursions.

 Summary 
The Adventure Path consists of the following scenarios:

During the course of the adventure, the city is nearly destroyed by an eruption of the volcano under it, which is triggered by magical forces. Shattered, but still inhabited, the city of Cauldron still exists at the end of the adventure.

Reception
The reviewer from Pyramid noted that: "Traditionally, the roleplaying scenario comes in just a few parts, typically a trilogy or quartet. Rarely do they come longer, although The Shackled City Adventure Path is a rare exception, consisting of 12 parts."

The expanded hardcover edition of the Shackled City Adventure Path won three ENnie awards at the 2006 Gen Con game fair, taking home the gold award for "Best Adventure" and "Best Campaign Setting/Supplement", as well as the silver award for "Best Cartography".

ReviewsAlarums & Excursions'' (Issue 405 - Jun 2009)

References 

Dungeon Adventure Paths
ENnies winners
Greyhawk modules